Blue Horses or Die grossen blauen Pferde (The Large Blue Horses) is a 1911 painting by German painter and printmaker Franz Marc (1880–1916).

Background
In 1911 Marc was a founding member of Der Blaue Reiter (The Blue Rider), and was the center of a circle of German and Russian expatriate artists with August Macke, Wassily Kandinsky and several others whose works were seminal to the development of German Expressionism.

Analysis
This work, which represents three vividly coloured blue horses looking down in front of a landscape of rolling red hills, is characterized by its bright primary colors and a portrayal that simplicity, and a profound sense of emotion.  According to the 'Encyclopædia Britannica', "the powerfully simplified and rounded outlines of the horses are echoed in the rhythms of the landscape background, uniting both animals and setting into a vigorous and harmonious organic whole.".  It is thought that the curved lines used to depict the subject are to emphasize "a sense of harmony, peace, and balance" in a spiritually-pure animal world and that by viewing human beings are allowed to join this harmony.  Marc gave an emotional or psychological meaning or purpose to the colors he used in his work: blue was used for masculinity and spirituality, yellow represented feminine joy, and red encased the sound of violence and of base matter.  Marc used blue throughout his career to represent spirituality and his use of vivid color is thought to have been an attempt to eschew the material world to evoke a spiritual or transcendental essence. This oil painting on canvas measures 41.625 inches by 71.3125 inches (unframed) and is unsigned.

This is one of Marc's earliest major works depicting animals and the more important of his series of portraits of horses in various colors. It is often thought that Marc thought animals to be more pure and more beautiful than man and represented a more pantheistic understanding of the divine or of spirituality.

Swiss painter Jean Bloé Niestlé (1884–1942) urged Marc to "capture the essence of the animal."  According to art historian Gabi La Cava, Marc depicts "the feeling that is evoked by the subject matter is most important"—more so than zoological accuracy.

Provenance
In 1942, Blue Horses was purchased by the Walker Art Center in Minneapolis, Minnesota through The T. B. Walker Foundation and its Gilbert M. Walker Memorial Fund.  This was the first major modernist work to enter the collection.

In culture
The painting was the inspiration behind the title of a bestselling volume of poetry, Blue Horses (2014), by the American poet Mary Oliver.

Other notable animal paintings by Franz Marc
 Gelbe Kuh (Yellow Cow) (1911)
 Blaues Pferd I (Blue Horse I) (1911)
 Die Kleinen Blauen Pferde (The Small Blue Horses)
 Zwei Katzen, Blau und Gelb (Two Cats, Blue and Yellow) 1911
 Blaues Pferdchen (Little Blue Horse) 1912
 Der Turm der Blauen Pferde (The Tower of Blue Horses) (1913), missing since 1945.
 Die Kleinen Gelben Pferde (The Little Yellow Horses)

See also
 List of works by Franz Marc
 German Expressionism
 Horses in art

References

External links
 Walker Art Center
 

1911 paintings
Paintings by Franz Marc
Horses in art
Paintings in Minnesota